The Cartal is a right tributary of the river Casimcea in Romania. It flows into the Casimcea in Pantelimon de Jos.

References

Rivers of Constanța County
Rivers of Romania
1Cartal